Pilots is a 2000 Indian Malayalam-language drama film written and directed by Rajiv Anchal and produced by Menaka under Revathy Kalamandhir. Starring Suresh Gopi, Sreenivasan, and Praveena.

Plot

Bobby comes to high range as a helicopter pilot working for Robinson. His job is to spray copper sulphate (thurisu) in the rubber plantations. He is assisted by Venkidi and other workers. He faced some resistance from local workers like Chako. He also had to save Robinson from many troubles.

In a nearby convent he sees Sr. Cindrella and was shocked to realise that she is actually Megha Mathew, the sister of his best friend, of whose murder Bobby is currently accused of. Megha is the only witness who can prove Bobby's innocence. He fakes a helicopter malfunction and lands the copter in the convent so as to meet Megha in person. But Megha refuses to admit her identity to Bobby. She was not aware that her brother actually gave word to Bobby to give her hand to Bobby. Meanwhile, the murderers of her brother came in search of Megha. Bobby in the end rescues her from the villains and wins Megha.

Cast

Soundtrack

References

External links
 
 Pilots at the Malayalam Movie Database
 Metromatinee article
 OneIndia article
 MalluMovies article

2000s Malayalam-language films
Films scored by M. G. Radhakrishnan
Indian aviation films
Films directed by Rajiv Anchal